Bostra nanalis is a species of snout moth in the genus Bostra. It was described by Alfred Ernest Wileman in 1911, and is known from Japan and Taiwan.

References

Moths described in 1911
Pyralini
Moths of Asia